HMCS Annan was the name of multiple ships of the Royal Canadian Navy:

 , a River-class frigate from World War II, transferred to the US and renamed Natchez.
 , a River-class frigate originally constructed for the Royal Navy and transferred to Canada during World War II.

Battle honours
 Atlantic, 1944
 North Sea, 1945

References

 Government of Canada Ships' Histories - HMCS Annan

Royal Canadian Navy ship names